The East Coast Express is a daily train that runs between Hyderabad and Shalimar (near Kolkata). Earlier this train's terminating station was Howrah . This train numbered 18045/46 takes 30 hours to cover the distance of 1592 km due to a lot of stops on the way.

Train composition
This train has 11 Sleeper Coaches, Three 3AC-Tier Coaches, One 2AC-Tier Coach, 4 General and 1 SLR-EOG Coach, 1 EOG Coach & 1 High Capacity Parcel Van making a total of 22 coaches.

Locomotive
The train is hauled by a Lallaguda-based WAP-7 locomotive from Secunderabad to Vijayawada. It reverses there and gets another WAP-4 of Vijayawada loco shed and hauls it up to Visakhapatnam. It again reverses there a gets a WAP-4 from Visakhapatnam loco shed to haul the train up to Howrah.

Route
18045 – East Coast Express – SHALIMAR (KOLKATA )to HYDERABAD DECCAN

Gallery

References

External links 

Rail transport in Howrah
Transport in Hyderabad, India
Named passenger trains of India
Rail transport in West Bengal
Rail transport in Odisha
Rail transport in Andhra Pradesh
Rail transport in Telangana
Railway services introduced in 1975
Express trains in India